Faton Popova (born 22 December 1984 in Stolberg) is a German retired footballer. Popova also holds Albanian citizenship.

References

External links
 

1984 births
Living people
German footballers
German people of Albanian descent
Alemannia Aachen players
2. Bundesliga players
Association football midfielders
People from Stolberg (Rhineland)
Sportspeople from Cologne (region)
Footballers from North Rhine-Westphalia